Stamford is a town in Bennington County, Vermont, United States. The population was 861 at the 2020 census.

Geography
Stamford is located near the southwestern corner of Vermont, on the Massachusetts state line. To the south of Stamford lie the towns of Clarksburg and Florida, Massachusetts. Stamford is also bordered by the Vermont towns of Pownal to the west, Readsboro to the east, and Woodford to the north. The village of Stamford is in the southern part of town, in the valley of the North Branch of the Hoosic River.

Two state-maintained routes share a concurrency through Stamford: Vermont Route 8 and Vermont Route 100. They are the only state highways through town, and the concurrency has its southern terminus at the Massachusetts state line.

Demographics

As of the census of 2000, there were 813 people, 313 households, and 235 families residing in the town.  The population density was 20.6 people per square mile (7.9/km2).  There were 387 housing units at an average density of 9.8 per square mile (3.8/km2).  The racial makeup of the town was 98.52% White, 0.25% Native American, 0.37% Asian, and 0.86% from two or more races. Hispanic or Latino of any race were 0.25% of the population.

There were 313 households, out of which 31.6% had children under the age of 18 living with them, 66.8% were married couples living together, 5.4% had a female householder with no husband present, and 24.9% were non-families. 16.9% of all households were made up of individuals, and 5.4% had someone living alone who was 65 years of age or older.  The average household size was 2.60 and the average family size was 2.96.

In the town, the population was spread out, with 25.5% under the age of 18, 5.2% from 18 to 24, 28.4% from 25 to 44, 28.0% from 45 to 64, and 12.9% who were 65 years of age or older.  The median age was 41 years. For every 100 females, there were 102.7 males.  For every 100 females age 18 and over, there were 96.8 males.

The median income for a household in the town was $48,988, and the median income for a family was $49,345. Males had a median income of $39,196 versus $24,375 for females. The per capita income for the town was $19,575.  About 2.4% of families and 3.8% of the population were below the poverty line, including 1.7% of those under age 18 and 11.6% of those age 65 or over.

Notable people

 Stephen C. Millard (1841–1914), U.S. congressman from New York
 Ezra Miller (1992–), actor

References

External links 

 
Towns in Vermont
Towns in Bennington County, Vermont